Euxoa tronellus is a moth of the family Noctuidae first described by Smith in 1903. It is found in western North America.

The wingspan is 32–36 mm. The moth flies from August to September depending on the location.

References

Euxoa
Moths of North America
Moths described in 1903